Escadron d'Entraînement 3/8 Côte d'Or is a French Air and Space Force (Armée de l'air et de l'espace) Training Squadron located at Cazaux Air Base, Gironde, France which operates the Dassault/Dornier Alpha Jet.

See also

 List of French Air and Space Force aircraft squadrons

References

French Air and Space Force squadrons